Western Sydney Wanderers Football Club is an Australian professional association football club based in Rooty Hill, New South Wales; the club was formed in 2012. They became the fourth team based in New South Wales, and the second team based in Sydney to compete in the A-League Men.

As of the end of the 2021-22 season, the club have participated in ten seasons in the top division of Australian soccer - the A-League. The club finished their inaugural season in 1st place, winning the Premiership and are the only Australian team to win the AFC Champions League, doing so in 2014. The club has also qualified for the A-League Grand Final in 2013, 2014 and 2016, losing all 3.

Key
Key to league competitions:
 A-League – Australia's top soccer league, established in 2005.
 Finals – The annual postseason elimination tournament for the A-League.
 Australia Cup – Australia's national football knockout cup, established in 2014. Formerly knows as the FFA Cup until the 2021 season.
 AFC Champions League (ACL) – The most prestigious club competition in Asian football; introduced in 1967 as the Asian Champion Club Tournament,
 FIFA Club World Cup (CWC) – A knockout tournament, organised by FIFA encompassing the winners of the respective club competitions in the AFC, CAF, CONCACAF, CONMEBOL, OFC, UEFA along with the host nation.

Key to colours and symbols:

Key to league record:
 Season = The year and article of the season
 League = League name
 P = Games played
 W = Games won
 D = Games drawn
 L = Games lost
 GF = Goals scored
 GA = Goals against
 Pts = Points
 Pos = Final position

Key to cup record:
 Dash (-) = Did not qualify
 QR1 = First qualification round
 QR2 = Second qualification round, etc.
 Group = Group stage
 R1 = First round
 R2 = Second round, etc.
 R32 = Round of 32
 R16 = Round of 16
 QF = Quarter-finals
 SF = Semi-finals
 RU = Runners-up
 W = Winners

Seasons

Footnotes

References

External links
 Official website
 Ultimate A-League
 A-League Stats

Seasons
Western Sydney Wanderers FC seasons
Australian soccer club seasons
Sydney-sport-related lists